KHWB-LD, virtual channel 38 (UHF digital channel 34), is a low-powered NRB TV-affiliated television station licensed to Eugene, Oregon, United States. The station is owned by His Word Broadcasting.

History
KHWB-LD signed on in May 1982 as W59AS on channel 59, a satellite repeater of the PTL Network via WJAN-TV (channel 17, now WDLI-TV) from Canton, Ohio. W59AS was owned by Full Gospel Fellowship International. The W59AS call sign was unusual for a station in Oregon, as call signs starting with W are usually issued east of the Mississippi River; this was rectified on November 30, 1987, when the station became K59DJ.

His Word Broadcasting bought the station in 1990. K59DJ eventually began to carry TBN via Portland's KNMT (channel 24). The station moved to channel 38, becoming K38JK, in 2009, and converted to digital broadcasting in 2010. The call letters were changed to KHWB-LD on May 28, 2013; however, it has called itself "KHWB" (a reference to its owner) since at least 1993. The station moved to channel 34 in 2018.

Digital channels
The station's digital signal is multiplexed:

Translator

References

External links
His Word Broadcasting website

Trinity Broadcasting Network affiliates
Low-power television stations in the United States
HWB-LD
Television channels and stations established in 1982
1982 establishments in Oregon